Espenes may refer to several locations in Norway:

Espenes, Agder, a village area in Grimstad municipality, Agder county
Espenes, Dyrøy, a village in Dyrøy municipality, Troms og Finnmark county
Espenes, Viken, a village in Indre Østfold municipality, Viken county